Ulinka Rublack  (born 1967) is a German historian. She received her PhD from the University of Cambridge, and is a professor in Early Modern European History and a Fellow of St John's College, Cambridge. Rublack is the founder of the Cambridge History for Schools outreach programme and a co-founder of the Cambridge Centre for Gender Studies. She is German, and her father  was also a historian.

Rublack has been part of the expert panel for BBC Radio 4's In Our Time on several occasions. In December 2016 for Kepler; In December 2018 for Thirty Years' War; and in November 2020 for Albrecht Dürer.

Honours
Her book Dressing Up: Cultural Identity in Early Modern Europe was winner of the Bainton Book Prize in 2011.

In July 2017, Rublack was elected a Fellow of the British Academy (FBA), the United Kingdom's national academy for the humanities and social sciences.

Selected publications

References 

Fellows of St John's College, Cambridge
Living people
German women academics
German women historians
21st-century German historians
Fellows of the British Academy
1967 births
History Today people